Short Change was a consumer affairs programme for children, broadcast on BBC One and later also the CBBC Channel. It is essentially a version of the prime-time show Watchdog except that it is aimed at children. The show was first aired on 20 February 1994. It had 13 series; the last episode was broadcast on 12 July 2005.

Transmission guide

Specials 
Series 3 compilation: 5 January 1997
Fan Clubs Special: 9 November 1997
The Fat Nation Challenge: 18 editions from 9 September 2004 – 7 November 2004

PriceBusters Competition
On each programme, viewers were challenged to find the cheapest and most expensive prices for a given product throughout the country. Two winners each week (one finding each extreme price) would win a boom-box stereo. Bill Bennett won the competition two weeks running, by finding the most expensive prices for the given products, and including Tesco.com's grocery delivery charge of £5. This made the cost of a Mullerice around £5.40, much more expensive than prices found by any other entrant. After his two consecutive wins, the rules were changed to specifically exclude delivery charges.

See also
Street Cents, a CBC program influenced by Short Change

References
Source: BFI/BBC Motion Gallery

BBC children's television shows
Consumer protection television series
Consumer protection in the United Kingdom
1994 British television series debuts
2005 British television series endings
1990s British children's television series
2000s British children's television series
English-language television shows